Ronald Hatcher Jr. (born June 28, 1959 in Fort Worth, Texas), better known as Gene Hatcher, is a former boxer who was world light welterweight champion. His nickname was "Mad Dog."

Amateur career
Hatcher was a United States Amateur Champion. In 1980 he became National AAU Welterweight Champion.

Early professional career
His most notable early win came against former WBC super featherweight champion Alfredo Escalera in 1982, when he won a ten-round decision. His next notable opponent, Tyrone Crawley, defeated him by a ten-round decision. He followed that with a rematch in 1983 with Escalera. In that fight, Hatcher was dropped in round six and subsequently lost a unanimous ten-round decision.

Champion
After racking up a few wins, Hatcher faced WBA light welterweight champion Johnny Bumphus on June 1, 1984, in Buffalo, New York. In what Ring magazine called its "Upset of the Year," Hatcher scored an eleventh-round technical knockout over Bumphus.  When Hatcher knocked Bumphus down, he slipped and fell on a follow-up attempt. He then threw Bumphus down to the mat when both fighters clinched.  A post-fight melee in the ring ensued after the stoppage.

Hatcher's first defense was against Uby Sacco in December of the same year. He won a fifteen-round split decision.  Sacco, however, won their July 1985 rematch (and title) with a ninth round knockout win in Italy (the fight was stopped by the referee because of a Hatcher cut).  In Hatcher's next - and last - chance at a world crown, he lost by knockout in 45 seconds to Lloyd Honeyghan in August 1987, with Honeyghan's WBC and IBF welterweight belts being at stake.

Post-championship career
After losing to Honeyghan, Hatcher continued to fight. He had seven more fights, losing two (one of which was to future world champion Aaron Davis). After a victory in Ft. Worth over Juan Martin Galvan in 1995, Hatcher retired.

In his career, Hatcher won 32 fights and lost 7, with 23 wins by knockout.

External links
Boxing Record

|-

Sportspeople from Fort Worth, Texas
1959 births
Living people
Light-welterweight boxers
World boxing champions
Boxers from Texas
American male boxers